David Weightman was an English professional association footballer who played as a centre forward. He played three matches in the Football League for Burnley.

References

English footballers
Association football forwards
Burnley F.C. players
English Football League players
Year of death missing
Year of birth missing